The palmar digital veins on each finger are connected to the dorsal digital veins by oblique intercapitular veins. They drain into a venous plexus which is situated over the thenar and hypothenar eminences and across the front of the wrist.

References

Veins of the upper limb